The 2015 Race of Champions was a motorsports event that took place over 20–21 November 2015 at the Olympic Stadium in London.

A previous six-time winner of the Nations' Cup, Sebastian Vettel became Champion of Champions for the first time, defeating Tom Kristensen, who made the final for the fourth time, 2–0. In the Nations' Cup itself, the England 1 team of Jason Plato and Andy Priaulx took the victory in a final race decider against Germany, who were represented by Vettel and fellow Formula One driver Nico Hülkenberg.

Participants

Cars
Eight vehicles were used throughout the event. Returning from the 2014 Race of Champions were the Ariel Atom Cup, the KTM X-Bow, the ROC Car and the NASCAR Chevrolet SS Stock Car as used in the NASCAR Whelen Euro Series. Introduced for 2015 were the Mercedes-AMG GT, the Radical SR3 RSX and the Rage Comet, while the RX 150 returned after an absence of several years.

Nations' Cup

Preliminary round

Bracket

Race of Champions

Preliminary round
The preliminary round pairs were:
  Ryan Hunter-Reay def.  José María López
  Andy Priaulx def.  Pascal Wehrlein
  Bradley Philpot def.  Mick Doohan
  Alex Buncombe def.  Jolyon Palmer

Knockout stage

References

External links 

 

Race of Champions
Race of Champions
Race of Champions
Race of Champions
Race of Champions
International sports competitions in London